Tunney may refer to:
 Tunney, Western Australia

Tunney is also a surname of Irish origin, and may refer to:
Frank Tunney (1912–1983), Canadian wrestling executive
Gene Tunney (1897–1978), American professional boxer; world heavyweight champion 1926–28
Jack Tunney (1935–2004), Canadian wrestling promoter
James Tunney (Canadian politician) (b. 1927), Canadian farmer and politician from Ontario; served one term in the Senate of Canada
James Tunney (Irish politician) (1892–1964), Irish politician; served for seven terms in Seanad Éireann and one term in Dáil Éireann
Jim Tunney (American football official) (contemporary), American football referee
Jim Tunney (Irish politician) (1923–2002), Irish politician; TD for Dublin North West 1969–92; Lord Mayor of Dublin 1984–85
John Tunney (naturalist) (1870–1929), Australian naturalist
John V. Tunney (1934-2018), American politician from California; U.S. senator 1971–77; son of Gene Tunney
Paddy Tunney (1921–2002), Irish singer, songwriter, and poet
Polly Lauder Tunney (1907-2008), American socialite and philanthropist 
Rebecca Tunney, Olympic gymnast  
Robin Tunney (b. 1972), American stage, film, and television actress
Thomas M. Tunney (b. 1955), American politician; alderman of the Chicago City Council since 2003

See also 
 Tunny (disambiguation)